Justin Downey (born 11 November 1986) is a South African rugby union footballer for Japanese Top East League side Tokyo Gas. His regular playing position is flanker.

Career

During this spell, he also represented the  during the 2012 Super Rugby season.

Downey returned to the  prior to the 2013 Currie Cup Premier Division.

In 2014, Downey signed a contract with Suntory Sungoliath.

References

External links

itsrugby.co.uk profile

Living people
1986 births
South African rugby union players
Rugby union flankers
Griquas (rugby union) players
Sharks (Currie Cup) players
Cheetahs (rugby union) players
South African people of British descent
White South African people
Rugby union players from Johannesburg
Tokyo Sungoliath players
South African expatriate rugby union players
South African expatriate sportspeople in Japan
Expatriate rugby union players in Japan
Sunwolves players
Mie Honda Heat players
Sharks (rugby union) players